With All My Might is the second studio album by Canadian country music artist George Fox. It was released by Warner Music Canada in 1989. The album peaked at number 84 on the RPM Top Albums chart and was certified gold by the CRIA.

Warner Bros. Records released the album in the United States in 1990 with a different track list and new artwork. The U.S. version included three songs previously included on Fox's debut album, "Angelina", "Hey Johnny", and "Lonesome Avenue Goodbye (Goldmine)".

Track listing
All songs written by George Fox except where noted.

Chart performance

References

External links
[ With All My Might] at Allmusic

1989 albums
George Fox albums
Albums produced by Brian Ahern (producer)